Akhbarul Hind (in Arabic اخبار الهند meaning The News of India) is an Arabic language fortnightly publication from Mumbai, India.

References 

Newspapers published in India
Arabic-language newspapers
Mass media in Mumbai
Publications with year of establishment missing